HD 74156 b is an extrasolar planet at least 1.88 times the mass of Jupiter that orbits the star HD 74156. It is most likely a gas giant. This planet was discovered in April 2001 by Dominique Naef and Michel Mayor along with the second planet HD 74156 c.

References

External links

Hydra (constellation)
Exoplanets discovered in 2001
Giant planets
Exoplanets detected by radial velocity